Kandahar Provincial Council is a Shura for Kandahar Province, Afghanistan.

Following the assassination of Provincial Council Chair Ahmed Wali Karzai in July 2011, former Deputy Chair Mohammad Ehsan Noorzai is acting chair.
Following the information of Afghanistan greatest scholar Alama Rishad baba in Jan 2007,

References 

 
Kandahar Province